Daroyah binti Alwi is a Malaysian politician and served as Selangor State Executive Councillor.

Politics

In the 2018 Malaysian General Elections, she won the N43 Selangor Selangor State Assembly seat on Pakatan Harapan (PH) and Parti Keadilan Rakyat (PKR) tickets. She also holds the portfolio of the Chairman of the Permanent Committee on Health, Welfare, Women's Affairs and Families of the Selangor State Government Council from May 2018 until June 2020.

At the grassroots level, she is the deputy chief of the People's Justice Party after winning the post in the 2010 PKR election and defeating two other candidates.

On June 13, 2020, she announced that she had quit the PKR party and became an independent assemblyman in support of the Perikatan Nasional coalition. She came out on the grounds that she had "lost confidence in the President (Anwar Ibrahim) and his harpist leadership of the idealism of the struggle".

Election Results

References 

Living people
People from Selangor
Malaysian people of Malay descent
Malaysian Muslims
Former People's Justice Party (Malaysia) politicians
21st-century Malaysian politicians
Members of the Selangor State Legislative Assembly
Selangor state executive councillors
1962 births